Nanabin Sign Language is a family sign language of the coastal Fante village of Ekumfi Nanabin in the Central Region of Ghana, ca. 8 km east of Mankessim. It is used by three generations of a single family which is mostly deaf. The second generation are bilingual in Ghanaian Sign Language.

Nanabin SL is similar to Adamorobe Sign Language in certain conventionalized signs deriving from Akan hearing culture. Both use lax handshapes and portray events from the perspective of the character rather than of the observer.

References

Brentari, ed, Sign Languages, CUP, 2010

Village sign languages
Sign languages of Ghana